Simoides is a genus of 7 species of Afrotropical hoverfly from the family Syrphidae, in the order Diptera.

Species
Simoides crassipes (Fabricius, 1805)

References

Hoverfly genera
Diptera of Africa
Taxa named by Hermann Loew
Eristalinae